Anagennisis Germasoyias is a Cypriot football club based in Yermasoyia, Lemesos province, Cyprus.
Anagennisis were founded in 1956. Their colours are blue and white and they play in Yermasoyia Municipal Stadium.
Annagennisis is well known for its close relationship with Apollon Limassol, for many considered to be their satellite team.

Achievements
Cypriot Fourth Division Winners: 1
2006

External links

http://www.soccerway.com/teams/cyprus/anagennisi-germasoyias/

1956 establishments in Cyprus
Football clubs in Cyprus